This is a list of submissions to the 91st Academy Awards for Best Foreign Language Film. The Academy of Motion Picture Arts and Sciences (AMPAS) has invited the film industries of various countries to submit their best film for the Academy Award for Best Foreign Language Film every year since the award was created in 1956. The award is presented annually by the Academy to a feature-length motion picture produced outside the United States that contains primarily non-English dialogue. The Foreign Language Film Award Committee oversees the process and reviews all the submitted films.

The submitted motion pictures must be first released theatrically in their respective countries between 1 October 2017 and 30 September 2018. The deadline for submissions was 1 October 2018, with the Academy announcing a list of eligible films on 8 October. A total of 89 countries submitted a film, with 87 of those being accepted. Two countries submitted a film for the first time. Malawi sent The Road to Sunrise and Niger sent The Wedding Ring.

From the longlist, nine finalists were shortlisted in late 2018, with the final five nominees announced on 22 January 2019. Roma by Alfonso Cuarón won the award, the first Mexican film to do so.

Submissions
{| class="wikitable sortable" width="98%" style="background:#f"
! Submitting country 
! Film title used in nomination !! Original title !! Language(s) !! Director(s) !! Result
|-
| data-sort-value="Afghanistan"| 
| data-sort-value="Rona, Azim's Mother"| Rona, Azim's Mother
| data-sort-value="Rona, Madar-e Azim"| رونا مادر عظیم (Rona, Madar-e Azim)
| Persian, Dari
| data-sort-value="Mahmoudi, Jamshid"|Jamshid Mahmoudi
| 
|-
| data-sort-value="Algeria"| 
| data-sort-value="Until the End of Time"| Until the End of Time
| data-sort-value="Akher Ezaman"| إلى آخر الزمان (Akher Ezaman)
| Arabic
| data-sort-value="Chouikh, Yasmine"|Yasmine Chouikh
| 
|-
| data-sort-value="Argentina"| 
| data-sort-value="Ángel, El"| El Ángel
| data-sort-value="Angel, El"| El Ángel
| Spanish
| data-sort-value="Ortega, Luis"|Luis Ortega
| 
|-
| data-sort-value="Armenia"| 
| data-sort-value="Spitak"| Spitak
| data-sort-value="Spitak"| Սպիտակ (Spitak)
| Armenian, Russian, French
| data-sort-value="Kott, Alexander"|Alexander Kott
| 
|-
| data-sort-value="Australia"| 
| data-sort-value="Jirga"| Jirga
| data-sort-value="Jirga"| جرګه (Jirga)
| Pashto, English
| data-sort-value="Gilmour, Benjamin"|Benjamin Gilmour
| 
|-
| data-sort-value="Austria"| 
| data-sort-value="Waldheim Waltz"| The Waldheim Waltz
| data-sort-value="Waldheims Walzer"| Waldheims Walzer
| German, English, French
| data-sort-value="Beckermann, Ruth"|Ruth Beckermann
| 
|-
| data-sort-value="Bangladesh"| 
| data-sort-value="No Bed of Roses"| No Bed of Roses
| data-sort-value="Doob"| ডুব (Doob)
| Bengali, English
| data-sort-value="Farooki, Mostofa Sarwa"|Mostofa Sarwar Farooki
| 
|-
| data-sort-value="Belarus"| 
| data-sort-value="Crystal Swan"| Crystal Swan
| data-sort-value="Хрусталь"| Хрусталь (Khrustal')
| Russian, English
| data-sort-value="Zhuk, Darya"|Darya Zhuk
| 
|-
| data-sort-value="Belgium"| 
| data-sort-value="Girl"| Girl
| data-sort-value="Girl"| Girl
| Flemish, Dutch, French, English
| data-sort-value="Dhont, Lukas"|Lukas Dhont
| 
|-
| data-sort-value="Bolivia"| 
| data-sort-value="Goalkeeper, The"| The Goalkeeper
| data-sort-value="Muralla"| Muralla
| Spanish
| data-sort-value="Patino, Rodrigo"|Rodrigo Patiño
| 
|-
| data-sort-value="Bosnia"| 
| data-sort-value="Never Leave Me"| Never Leave Me
| data-sort-value="Ne ostavljaj me"| Ne ostavljaj me
| Arabic, Turkish
| data-sort-value="Begic, Aida"|Aida Begić
| 
|-
| data-sort-value="Brazil"| 
| data-sort-value="Great Mystical Circus, The"| The Great Mystical Circus
| data-sort-value="Grande Circo Mistico, O"| O Grande Circo Místico
| Portuguese
| data-sort-value="Diegues, Caca"|Cacá Diegues
| 
|-
| data-sort-value="Bulgaria"| 
| data-sort-value="Omnipresent"| Omnipresent
| data-sort-value="Vezdesŭshtiyat"| Вездесъщият (Vezdesŭshtiyat)
| Bulgarian
| data-sort-value="Djevelekov, Ilian"|Ilian Djevelekov
| 
|-
| data-sort-value="Cambodia"| 
| data-sort-value="Graves Without a Name"| Graves Without a Name
| data-sort-value="Tombeaux sans noms, Les"| ផ្នូរគ្មានឈ្មោះ, Les tombeaux sans noms
| French, Khmer
| data-sort-value="Panh, Rithy"|Rithy Panh
| 
|-
| data-sort-value="Canada"| 
| data-sort-value="Family First"| Family First
| data-sort-value="Chien de garde"| Chien de garde
| French
| data-sort-value="Dupuis, Sophie"|Sophie Dupuis
| 
|-
| data-sort-value="Chile"| 
| data-sort-value="And Suddenly the Dawn"| And Suddenly the Dawn
| data-sort-value="Y de pronto el amanecer"| Y de pronto el amanecer
| Spanish
| data-sort-value="Caiozzi, Silvio"|Silvio Caiozzi
| 
|-
| data-sort-value="China"| 
| data-sort-value="Hidden Man"| Hidden Man
| data-sort-value="Hidden Man"| 邪不压正 (Xie Bu Ya Zheng)
| Mandarin
| data-sort-value="Jiang, Wen"|Jiang Wen
| 
|-
| data-sort-value="Colombia"| 
| data-sort-value="Birds of Passage"| Birds of Passage
| data-sort-value="Pajaros de verano"| Pájaros de verano
| Wayuu, Spanish, English, Wiwa
| data-sort-value="Gallego, Cristina"|Cristina Gallego and Ciro Guerra
| 
|-
| data-sort-value="Costa Rica"| 
| data-sort-value="Medea"| Medea
| data-sort-value="Medea"| Medea
| Spanish
| data-sort-value="Salazar, Alexandra Latishev"|Alexandra Latishev Salazar
| 
|-
| data-sort-value="Croatia"| 
| data-sort-value="Eighth Commissioner"| The Eighth Commissioner
| data-sort-value="Osmi povjerenik"| Osmi povjerenik
| Croatian
| data-sort-value="Salaj, Ivan"|Ivan Salaj
| 
|-
| data-sort-value="Cuba"| 
| data-sort-value="Sergio and Sergei"| Sergio and Sergei
| data-sort-value="Sergio & Sergei"| Sergio & Sergei
| Spanish, English, Russian
| data-sort-value="Daranas, Ernesto"|Ernesto Daranas
| 
|-
| data-sort-value="Czech Republic"| 
| data-sort-value="Winter Flies"| Winter Flies
| data-sort-value="Vsechno bude"| Všechno bude
| Czech
| data-sort-value="Omerzu, Olmo"|Olmo Omerzu
| 
|-
| data-sort-value="Denmark"| 
| data-sort-value="Guilty, The"| The Guilty
| data-sort-value="Skyldige, Den"| Den skyldige
| Danish
| data-sort-value="Moller, Gustav"|Gustav Möller
| 
|-
| data-sort-value="Dominican Republic"| 
| data-sort-value="Cocote"| Cocote
| data-sort-value="Cocote"| Cocote
| Spanish
| data-sort-value="Arias, Nelson Carlo de Los Santos"|Nelson Carlo de Los Santos Arias
| 
|-
| data-sort-value="Ecuador"| 
| data-sort-value="Son of Man, A"| A Son of Man
| data-sort-value="Son of Man, A"| A Son of Man
| Spanish, English, German, Quechua
| data-sort-value="Jamaicanoproblem"|Jamaicanoproblem and Pablo Agüero
| 
|-
| data-sort-value="Egypt"| 
| data-sort-value="Yomeddine"| Yomeddine
| data-sort-value="Yomeddine"| يوم الدين (Yomeddine)
| Arabic
| data-sort-value="Shawky, Abu Bakr"|Abu Bakr Shawky
| 
|-
| data-sort-value="Estonia"| 
| data-sort-value="Take It or Leave It"| Take It or Leave It
| data-sort-value="Vota voi jata"| Võta või jäta
| Estonian
| data-sort-value="Triskina-Vanhatalo, Liina"|Liina Triškina-Vanhatalo
| 
|-
| data-sort-value="Finland"| 
| data-sort-value="Euthanizer"| Euthanizer
| data-sort-value="Armomurhaaja"| Armomurhaaja
| Finnish
| data-sort-value="Nikki, Teemu"|Teemu Nikki
| 
|-
| data-sort-value="France"| 
| data-sort-value="Memoir of War"| Memoir of War
| data-sort-value="Douleur, La"| La douleur
| French
| data-sort-value="Finkiel, Emmanuel"|Emmanuel Finkiel
| 
|-
| data-sort-value="Georgia"| 
| data-sort-value="Namme by "| Namme| data-sort-value="Namme"| ნამე (Namme)| Georgian
| data-sort-value="Khalvashi, Zaza"|Zaza Khalvashi
| 
|-
| data-sort-value="Germany"| 
| data-sort-value="Never Look Away"| Never Look Away| data-sort-value="Werk ohne Autor"| Werk ohne Autor| German
| data-sort-value="Donnersmarck, Florian Henckel"|Florian Henckel von Donnersmarck
| 
|-
| data-sort-value="Greece"| 
| data-sort-value="Polyxeni"| Polyxeni| data-sort-value="Polyxeni"| Πολυξένη (Polyxeni)| Greek, Turkish
| data-sort-value="Masklavanou, Dora"|Dora Masklavanou
| 
|-
| data-sort-value="Hong Kong"| 
| data-sort-value="Operation Red Sea"| Operation Red Sea| data-sort-value="Operation Red Sea"| 红海行动 (Hóng Hǎi Xíngdòng)| Mandarin, English, Arabic
| data-sort-value="Lam, Dante"|Dante Lam
| 
|-
| data-sort-value="Hungary"| 
| data-sort-value="Sunset"| Sunset| data-sort-value="Napszallta"| Napszállta| Hungarian, German
| data-sort-value="Nemes, Laszlo"|László Nemes
| 
|-
| data-sort-value="Iceland"| 
| data-sort-value="Woman at War"| Woman at War| data-sort-value="Kona fer i strio"| Kona fer í stríð| Icelandic, Spanish, English, Ukrainian
| data-sort-value="Erlingsson, Benedikt"|Benedikt Erlingsson
| 
|-
| data-sort-value="India"| 
| data-sort-value="Village Rockstars"| Village Rockstars| data-sort-value="Village Rockstars"| ভিলেজ ৰকষ্টাৰ্ছ (Village Rockstars)| Assamese
| data-sort-value="Das, Rima"|Rima Das
| 
|-
| data-sort-value="Indonesia"| 
| data-sort-value="Marlina the Murderer in Four Acts"| Marlina the Murderer in Four Acts| data-sort-value="Marlina Si Pembunuh dalam Empat Babak"| Marlina Si Pembunuh dalam Empat Babak| Indonesian
| data-sort-value="Surya, Mouly"|Mouly Surya
| 
|-
| data-sort-value="Iran"| 
| data-sort-value="No Date, No Signature"| No Date, No Signature| data-sort-value="No Date, No Signature"| بدون تاریخ، بدون امضا (Bedoone Tarikh, Bedoone Emza)| Persian
| data-sort-value="Jalilvand, Vahid"|Vahid Jalilvand
| 
|-
| data-sort-value="Iraq"| 
| data-sort-value="Journey, The"| The Journey| data-sort-value="Journey"| الرحلة (Al rahal)| Arabic
| data-sort-value="Daradji, Mohamed"|Mohamed Al-Daradji
| 
|-
| data-sort-value="Israel"| 
| data-sort-value="Cakemaker"| The Cakemaker| data-sort-value="Cakemaker"| האופה מברלין (HaOfeh MiBerlin)| English, Hebrew, German
| data-sort-value="Grazier, Ofir Raul"|Ofir Raul Grazier
| 
|-
| data-sort-value="Italy"| 
| data-sort-value="Dogman"| Dogman| data-sort-value="Dogman"| Dogman| Italian
| data-sort-value="Garrone, Matteo"|Matteo Garrone
| 
|-
| data-sort-value="Japan"| 
| data-sort-value="Shoplifters"| Shoplifters| data-sort-value="Manbiki Kazoku"| 万引き家族 (Manbiki Kazoku)| Japanese
|data-sort-value="Kore-eda, Hirokazu"| Hirokazu Kore-eda
| 
|-
| data-sort-value="Kazakhstan"| 
| data-sort-value="Ayka"| Ayka| data-sort-value="Ayka"| Айка| Russian, Kyrgyz
| data-sort-value="Dvortsevoy, Sergey"|Sergey Dvortsevoy
| 
|-
| data-sort-value="Kenya"| 
| data-sort-value="Supa Modo"| Supa Modo| data-sort-value="Supa Modo"| Supa Modo| Swahili
| data-sort-value="Wainaina, Likarion"|Likarion Wainaina
| 
|-
| data-sort-value="Kosovo"| 
| data-sort-value="Marriage, The"| The Marriage| data-sort-value="Martesa"| Martesa| Albanian
| data-sort-value="Zeqiri, Blerta"|Blerta Zeqiri
| 
|-
| data-sort-value="Kyrgyzstan"| 
| data-sort-value="Night Accident"| Night Accident| data-sort-value="Tunku Kyrsyk"| Ночная авария (Tunku Kyrsyk)| Kyrgyz
| data-sort-value="Birnazarov, Temirbek"|Temirbek Birnazarov
| 
|-
| data-sort-value="Latvia"| 
| data-sort-value="To Be Continued"| To Be Continued| data-sort-value="Turpinajums"| Turpinājums| Latvian
| data-sort-value="Seleckis, Ivars"|Ivars Seleckis
| 
|-
| data-sort-value="Lebanon"| 
| data-sort-value="Capernaum"| Capernaum| data-sort-value="Capernaum"| کفرناحوم (Capharnaüm)| Arabic, Amharic
| data-sort-value="Labaki, Nadine"|Nadine Labaki
| 
|-
| data-sort-value="Lithuania"| 
| data-sort-value="Wonderful Losers"| Wonderful Losers: A Different World| data-sort-value="Nuostabieji"| Nuostabieji Luzeriai. Kita planeta| Italian, English, Dutch
| data-sort-value="Matelis, Arunas"|Arūnas Matelis
| 
|-
| data-sort-value="Luxembourg"| 
| data-sort-value="Gutland"| Gutland| data-sort-value="Gutland"| Gutland| Luxembourgish, German
| data-sort-value="Van Maele, Govinda"|Govinda Van Maele
| 
|-
| data-sort-value="Macedonia"|  Macedonia
| data-sort-value="Secret Ingredient"| Secret Ingredient| data-sort-value="Iscelitel"| Исцелител (Iscelitel)| Macedonian
| data-sort-value="Stavreski, Gjorce"|Gjorce Stavreski
| 
|-
| data-sort-value="Malawi"| 
| data-sort-value="Road to Sunrise, The"| The Road to Sunrise| data-sort-value="Road to Sunrise, The"| The Road to Sunrise| Chichewa, English 
| data-sort-value="Joyah, Shemu"|Shemu Joyah
| 
|-
| data-sort-value="Mexico"| 
| data-sort-value="Roma"| Roma| data-sort-value="Roma"| Roma| Spanish, Mixtec
| data-sort-value="Cuaron, Alfonso"|Alfonso Cuarón
|
|-
| data-sort-value="Montenegro"| 
| data-sort-value="Iskra"| Iskra| data-sort-value="Iskra"| Iskra| Serbian
| data-sort-value="Berkuljan, Gojko"|Gojko Berkuljan
| 
|-
| data-sort-value="Morocco"| 
| data-sort-value="Burnout"| Burnout| data-sort-value="Burnout"| بورن أوت (Burn 'uwt)| Arabic, French
| data-sort-value="Lakhmari, Nour-Eddine"|Nour-Eddine Lakhmari
| 
|-
| data-sort-value="Nepal"| 
| data-sort-value="Panchayat"| Panchayat| data-sort-value="Panchayat"| पंचायत (Panchayat)| Nepali
| data-sort-value="Adhikari, Shivam"|Shivam Adhikari
| 
|-
| data-sort-value="Netherlands"| 
| data-sort-value="Resistance Banker, The"| The Resistance Banker| data-sort-value="Bankier van het Verzet"| Bankier van het Verzet| Dutch
| data-sort-value="Lursen, Joram"|Joram Lürsen
| 
|-
| data-sort-value="New Zealand"| 
| data-sort-value="Yellow Is Forbidden"| Yellow Is Forbidden| data-sort-value="Yellow Is Forbidden"| Yellow is Forbidden| Mandarin
| data-sort-value="Brettkelly, Pietra"|Pietra Brettkelly
| 
|-
| data-sort-value="Niger"| 
| data-sort-value="Wedding Ring, The"| The Wedding Ring| data-sort-value="Zin'naariya!"| Zin'naariya!| Zarma, Songhay Ciiné, Hausa, Fulani 
| data-sort-value="Keita, Rahmatou"|Rahmatou Keïta
| 
|-
| data-sort-value="Norway"| 
| data-sort-value="What Will People Say"| What Will People Say| data-sort-value="Hva vil folk si"| Hva vil folk si| Norwegian, Urdu
| data-sort-value="Haq, Iram"|Iram Haq
| 
|-
| data-sort-value="Pakistan"| 
| data-sort-value="Cake"| Cake| data-sort-value="Cake"| کیک (Cake)| Urdu
| data-sort-value="Abbasi, Asim"|Asim Abbasi
| 
|-
| data-sort-value="Palestine"| 
| data-sort-value="Ghost Hunting"| Ghost Hunting| data-sort-value="Istiyad ashbah"| إصطياد اشباح (Istiyad ashbah)| Arabic, English
| data-sort-value="Andoni, Raed"|Raed Andoni
| 
|-
| data-sort-value="Panama"| 
| data-sort-value="Ruben Blades Is Not My Name"| Ruben Blades Is Not My Name| data-sort-value="Yo No Me Llamo Rubén Blades"| Yo No Me Llamo Rubén Blades| Spanish, English
| data-sort-value="Benaim, Abner"|Abner Benaim
| 
|-
| data-sort-value="Paraguay"| 
| data-sort-value="Heiresses, The"| The Heiresses| data-sort-value="Herederas, Las"| Las herederas| Spanish
| data-sort-value="Martinessi, Marcelo"|Marcelo Martinessi
| 
|-
| data-sort-value="Peru"| 
| data-sort-value="Eternity"| Eternity| data-sort-value="Winaypacha"| Wiñaypacha| Aymara
| data-sort-value="Catacora, Oscar"|Oscar Catacora
| 
|-
| data-sort-value="Philippines"| 
| data-sort-value="Signal Rock"| Signal Rock| data-sort-value="Signal Rock"| Signal Rock| Filipino
| data-sort-value="Rono, Chito S."|Chito S. Roño
| 
|-
| data-sort-value="Poland"| 
| data-sort-value="Cold War"| Cold War| data-sort-value="Zimna wojna"| Zimna wojna| Polish, French
| data-sort-value="Pawlikowski, Pawel"|Paweł Pawlikowski
| 
|-
| data-sort-value="Portugal"| 
| data-sort-value="Pilgrimage"| Pilgrimage| data-sort-value="Peregrinacao"| Peregrinação| Portuguese, Japanese, Chinese, Latin, Indonesian
| data-sort-value="Botelho, Joao"|João Botelho
| 
|-
| data-sort-value="Romania"| 
| data-sort-value="I Do Not Care"| I Do Not Care If We Go Down in History as Barbarians| data-sort-value="Imi este"| Îmi este indiferent dacă în istorie vom intra ca barbari| Romanian
| data-sort-value="Jude, Radu"|Radu Jude
| 
|-
| data-sort-value="Russia"| 
| data-sort-value="Sobibor"| Sobibor| data-sort-value="Sobibor"| Собибор (Sobibor)| Russian, German, Dutch, Polish, Yiddish
| data-sort-value="Khabensky, Konstantin"|Konstantin Khabensky
| 
|-
| data-sort-value="Serbia"| 
| data-sort-value="Offenders"| Offenders| data-sort-value="Izgrednici"|  Izgrednici| Serbian
| data-sort-value="Zecevic, Dejan"| Dejan Zečević
| 
|-
| data-sort-value="Singapore"| 
| data-sort-value="Buffalo Boys"| Buffalo Boys| data-sort-value="Buffalo Boys"| Buffalo Boys| Indonesian, English
| data-sort-value="Wiluan, Mike"|Mike Wiluan
| 
|-
| data-sort-value="Slovakia"| 
| data-sort-value="Interpreter"| The Interpreter| data-sort-value="Tlmocnik"| Tlmočník| German, Slovak, Russian
| data-sort-value="Sulik, Martin"|Martin Šulík
| 
|-
| data-sort-value="Slovenia"| 
| data-sort-value="Ivan"| Ivan| data-sort-value="Ivan"|  Ivan| Slovenian, Italian
| data-sort-value="Burger, Janez"| Janez Burger
| 
|-
| data-sort-value="South Africa"| 
| data-sort-value="Sew the Winter to My Skin"| Sew the Winter to My Skin| data-sort-value="Sew the Winter to My Skin"|  Sew the Winter to My Skin| Afrikaans, Xhosa, English
| data-sort-value="Qubeka, Jahmil X.T."| Jahmil X.T. Qubeka
| 
|-
| data-sort-value="South Korea"| 
| data-sort-value="Burning"| Burning| data-sort-value="Beoning"|  버닝 (Beoning)| Korean
| data-sort-value="Lee, Chang-dong"| Lee Chang-dong
| 
|-
| data-sort-value="Spain"| 
| data-sort-value="Champions"| Champions| data-sort-value="Campeones"| Campeones| Spanish
| data-sort-value="Fesser, Javier"|Javier Fesser
| 
|-
| data-sort-value="Sweden"| 
| data-sort-value="Border"| Border| data-sort-value="Grans"| Gräns| Swedish
|data-sort-value="Abbasi, Ali"| Ali Abbasi
| 
|-
| data-sort-value="Switzerland"| 
| data-sort-value="Eldorado"| Eldorado| data-sort-value="Eldorado"| Eldorado| German
| data-sort-value="Imhoof, Markus"|Markus Imhoof
| 
|-
| data-sort-value="Taiwan"| 
| data-sort-value="Great Buddha +, The"| The Great Buddha+| data-sort-value="Great Buddha +, The"| 大佛普拉斯 (Dà fó pǔ lā sī)| Taiwanese Hokkien, Mandarin, English
| data-sort-value="Huang, Hsin-yao"|Huang Hsin-yao
| 
|-
| data-sort-value="Thailand"| 
| data-sort-value="Malila: The Farewell Flower| Malila: The Farewell Flower| data-sort-value="Malila"| มะลิลา (Malila)| Thai
| data-sort-value="Boonyawatana, Anucha"|Anucha Boonyawatana
| 
|-
| data-sort-value="Tunisia"| 
| data-sort-value="Beauty and the Dogs"| Beauty and the Dogs| data-sort-value="Aala Kaf Ifrit"| على كف عفريت (ʿAlā kaff ʿifrīt)| Arabic
| data-sort-value="Hania, Kaouther Ben"|Kaouther Ben Hania
| 
|-
| data-sort-value="Turkey"| 
| data-sort-value="Wild Pear Tree, The"| The Wild Pear Tree| data-sort-value="Ahlat Agaci"| Ahlat Ağacı| Turkish
| data-sort-value="Ceylan, Nuri Bilge"|Nuri Bilge Ceylan
| 
|-
| data-sort-value="Ukraine"| 
| data-sort-value="Donbass"| Donbass| data-sort-value="Donbass"| Донбас (Donbas)| Russian, Ukrainian
| data-sort-value="Loznitsa, Sergei"|Sergei Loznitsa
| 
|-
| data-sort-value="United Kingdom"| 
| data-sort-value="I Am Not a Witch"| I Am Not a Witch| data-sort-value="I Am Not a Witch"| I Am Not a Witch| English, Bemba, Nyanja
| data-sort-value="Nyoni, Rungano"|Rungano Nyoni
| 
|-
| data-sort-value="Uruguay"| 
| data-sort-value="Twelve-Year Night"| Twelve-Year Night| data-sort-value="Noche de 12 anos, La"| La noche de 12 años| Spanish
| data-sort-value="Brechner, Alvaro"|Álvaro Brechner
| 
|-
| data-sort-value="Venezuela"| 
| data-sort-value="Family, The"| The Family| data-sort-value="Familia, La"| La familia| Spanish
| data-sort-value="Cordova, Gustavo Rondon"|Gustavo Rondón Córdova
| 
|-
| data-sort-value="Vietnam"| 
| data-sort-value="Tailor, The"| The Tailor| data-sort-value="Co Ba Sai Gon"| Cô Ba Sài Gòn| Vietnamese
| data-sort-value="Tran, Buu Loc"|Trần Bửu Lộc and Nguyễn Lê Phương Khanh
| 
|-
| data-sort-value="Yemen"| 
| data-sort-value="Ten Days Before the Wedding"| 10 Days Before the Wedding| data-sort-value="10 Days Before the Wedding"| 10 أيام قبل الزفة (10 'ayaam qabl alzifaf)| Arabic
| data-sort-value="Gamal, Amr"|Amr Gamal
| 
|}

Notes
  Honduras were scheduled to announce their film on 21 September 2018. However, they did not submit a film.
  Kenya's government was initially sued by director Wanuri Kahiu, whose film Rafiki was denied a release from the Kenya Film Classification Board for its "clear intent to promote lesbianism in Kenya." Kahiu sued so the film will be eligible as Kenya's submission for Best Foreign Language Film. On 21 September 2018, the Kenyan High Court lifted the ban on the film, allowing it to be screened in the country for seven days, therefore meeting the eligibility requirements. Despite the ban being lifted, it was not selected as Kenya's submission in the Foreign Language Film category, with Supa Modo'' being sent instead.
  Puerto Rico had asked AMPAS to reconsider its position on allowing submissions from territories and protectorates of the United States. Puerto Rico last submitted a film for the Best Foreign Language Film in 2010, and has been ineligible since.

References

External links
 Official website of the Academy Awards

2017 in film
2018 in film
91